Andy or Andrew Todd may refer to:

Andrew Todd (bowls) (born 1966), New Zealand bowler
Andrew Todd (businessman) (1904–1976), New Zealand figure in the car assembly industry
Andrew Todd (fur trader) (1754–1796), Ulster merchant and fur trader in Montréal and Louisiana
Andrew Todd (rower) (born 1989), Canadian Paralympic rower
Andrew L. Todd Sr. (1872–1945), American lawyer, educator and member of the Tennessee General Assembly
Andy Todd (footballer, born 1974), English football player for Bolton, Charlton, Blackburn, Derby and Perth Glory
Andy Todd (footballer, born 1979), English football player for Rotherham and Mansfield
Andy Todd (musician) (born 1964), English musician
Andy Todd (rugby league), footballer for Scotland, and Edinburgh Eagles

See also
Andy Tod (born 1971), Scottish footballer